Luis José Barcala Sierra (born in 1962) is a lawyer and the current mayor of Alicante, Spain since 19 April 2018.

Biography 
Luis Barcala was born in Sant Joan d'Alicante. His father, Luis Barcala Muñoz, captain in the Spanish Air Force, died in a plane crash in Los Llanos, Albacete on November 19, 1974.

In his childhood, he was an athlete and in 1975 he won the Alicante provincial youth championship in 80 meters and 300 meter sprint.

He has been heavily involved in festivities of the Hogueras de San Juan. Since 1995 he has been a member of the "barraca" Els Chuanos (a social group that organizes activities during the event). In 1998 he became vice-secretary and in 2001 he became president of the barraca.

Political career 
In 2005, Luis Barcala joined the executive committee of the People's Party (PP) of Alicante as secretary of Study and Programs. In 2011, he became city councilor of Alicante after José Joaquín Ripoll resigned after being appointed president of the Port of Alicante.

In December 2013, he became councilor for Health and Environment in the administration of mayor Sonia Castedo. He resigned after the election of May 24th, 2015 when the Valencian Socialist Party (PSPV-PSOE), Guanyar Alacant (consisting of the United Left, Podemos, Green Party and the  Socialist Alternative) and Compromis formed an alliance (holding 15 of 29 council seats) to remove the PP from the city government and made Gabriel Echávarri mayor.

Mayor of Alicante 

On March 23, 2018, Gabriel Echávarri resigned after being indicted in several criminal cases, include allegations that he had fired the sister-in-law of Barcala in retaliation for the PP filing a criminal complain against him. PSPV-PSOE councilor Eva Montesinos became interim mayor, but city councilor Nerea Belmonte (who had previously been expelled from Podemos) abstained in the vote to confirm her. Since there was now no majority supporting an alternative candidate, Luis Barcala became mayor on April 19, 2018, as he had received the most seats in the 2015 election. There was an investigation into a possible attempt to bribe Nerea Belmonte to vote for Eva Montesinos, but the prosecutor closed the case due there being no evidence of a crime.

In the local elections of May 26, 2019, Barcala's People's Party won the most seats in Alicante, but did not achieve an absolute majority. With the help of Citizens, he received 14 of 29 council votes and was re-elected, as none of the other parties were able to form an alternative majority coalition and voted for their own candidates.

References

Living people
1962 births
20th-century Spanish lawyers
Mayors of places in the Valencian Community
People from Alicante
People's Party (Spain) politicians